Aztec Bowl was a football stadium (a Works Progress Administration project) on the San Diego State University campus in San Diego, California.

History
Aztec Bowl hosted the San Diego State University Aztecs football team until they moved to San Diego Stadium in 1967. The stadium held 12,592 people at its peak and cost $500,000 to build. It was dedicated on October 3, 1936, before 7,500 people, after being completed earlier that year.   

The stadium was initially supposed to be expanded to 45,000 seats but was expanded only once, in 1948.

The Aztec football team now plays at Snapdragon Stadium with their opening home game played on September 3, 2022.

Current use
Currently Viejas Arena (formerly Cox Arena), the school's basketball arena, sits on the site of the stadium.

National Register of Historic Places
Aztec Bowl was listed on the National Register of Historic Places: The old concrete bleachers of the football stadium were not demolished when the new arena was built. John F. Kennedy, then the President of the United States of America, gave the graduation commencement address at San Diego State University on June 6, 1963.

In commemoration, the arena was built on top of the steps from which people listened to President Kennedy. The bleachers can be clearly seen from the arena's parking lot on the outside and in the storage areas under the arena seats on the inside of the arena.

A request was made to remove the stadium from the National Register of Historic Places, and was removed on May 30, 2012.

See also
 Viejas Arena
 Peterson Gym

References

External links
 Venue information

Defunct college football venues
San Diego State Aztecs football venues
Sports venues in San Diego
American football venues in California
Works Progress Administration in California
University and college buildings on the National Register of Historic Places in California
Demolished sports venues in California
Sports venues completed in 1936
1936 establishments in California
North American Soccer League (1968–1984) stadiums
National Register of Historic Places in San Diego County, California
Sports venues on the National Register of Historic Places in California
Former National Register of Historic Places in California